17times world cup championship
Rita Kovács (born 29 March 1970 in Nyíregyháza) is a former long-distance swimmer from Hungary. She represented her home country at the 1996 Summer Olympics in 800 metre freestyle. She also competed in open water swimming, winning several medals. She started her carrier in a local sportclub, called NYVSSC (Nyíregyházi Vasutas Spartacus Sport Club).

References

1970 births
Living people
Hungarian female freestyle swimmers
Female long-distance swimmers
Hungarian female swimmers
People from Nyíregyháza
Olympic swimmers of Hungary
Swimmers at the 1996 Summer Olympics
World Aquatics Championships medalists in open water swimming
Sportspeople from Szabolcs-Szatmár-Bereg County